Sam Wardrop (born 20 October 1997) is a Scottish footballer, who last played as a defender for Scottish League One club Airdrieonians. His previous clubs include Celtic, Dundee United and Dumbarton.

Career
Wardrop started his career at Celtic, and captained the club's Under-20s to victory in the 2017 Scottish Youth Cup final.

On 1 August 2017, Wardrop joined Scottish Championship club Dumbarton on loan, until May 2018. He scored his first senior goal, the winner, against Inverness Caledonian Thistle in September 2017.

Wardrop signed a two-year contract with Dundee United on 31 May 2018. After suffering an injury that ruled out a potential loan return to Dumbarton in January 2019, he rejoined the club on loan in January 2020 playing seven times prior to the season being ended early by the COVID-19 pandemic.

Wardrop was then released by United in May 2020 and signed a permanent contract with Dumbarton. He left the club after one season in June 2021 and subsequently signed a one-year contract with Airdrieonians but left just two months into the season for personal reasons.

International career 

Wardrop was selected for the Scotland U17 team in the UEFA under-17 Championship in 2014, where the Netherlands beat them in the semi finals.

He was selected for the under-20 squad in the 2017 Toulon Tournament.  After a historic first ever win against Brazil, which was at any level. Scotland later won the bronze medal. It was the nations first ever medal at the competition.

Personal life
Wardrop attended Bearsden Academy.

Career statistics

References

External links

1997 births
Living people
Dumbarton F.C. players
Celtic F.C. players
Scottish footballers
Association football defenders
Scottish Professional Football League players
Dundee United F.C. players
Scotland youth international footballers
People educated at Bearsden Academy
Airdrieonians F.C. players